U.S. Route 160 (US 160) travels west to east across the Navajo Nation and Northeast Arizona for . US 160 begins at a junction with US 89 north of Cameron and exits the state into New Mexico southeast of the Four Corners National Monument. Along its journey, the route connects the communities of Tuba City, Moenkopi, Rare Metals, Tonalea, Tsegi, Kayenta, Dennehotso, Mexican Water, Red Mesa, and Teec Nos Pos.

The vast majority of US 160's route through Arizona runs through rural and sparsely populated sections. As a result, the road is entirely two-lane except two short four-lane sections in Tuba City and Kayenta. Most of US 160 in Arizona is also known as the Navajo Trail.

History
The current routing of US 160 was first planned in 1956, as Navajo Route 1, the first road of a reservation-wide highway system for the Navajo Nation. In 1961, the route between US 89 and Teec Nos Pos became a state highway as part of Arizona State Route 64, while the segment from Teec Nos Pos to the New Mexico state line became Arizona State Route 364 in 1963. In 1966, the route was added to the United States Numbered Highway System as part of U.S. Route 164 (US 164). In 1970, the designation was changed to the current US 160.

Major intersections

References

External links

 Arizona
Transportation in Coconino County, Arizona
Transportation in Navajo County, Arizona
Transportation in Apache County, Arizona
60-1